Klauber's blind snake (Epictia  subcrotilla) is a species of snake in the family Leptotyphlopidae.

References

Epictia
Reptiles described in 1939